Ballinode, also known as Bellanode, is a village situated approximately  from Monaghan Town and  from Scotstown in County Monaghan, Ireland. The village straddles the Monaghan Blackwater (a tributary of the River Corr, itself a tributary of the Ulster Blackwater) and has a Church of Ireland church with clock tower, cemetery, and church hall; one public house, and a takeaway. There also is an astroturf football pitch in the village.

Events
"On the road in Ballinode" was an annual festival held in Ballinode throughout the 1990s. It attracted visitors from all over the county and had events such as cart racing, amusements and canoeing races on the river.

Transport 
Local Link bus route M1 links the village with Monaghan several times daily Mondays to Saturdays inclusive.

See also
 List of towns and villages in Ireland

References

Towns and villages in County Monaghan